Treaty of Jeddah may refer to:
Treaty of Jeddah (1927), between the Kingdom of Nejd and Hejaz and the United Kingdom
Treaty of Jeddah (1974), between the Kingdom of Saudi Arabia and the United Arab Emirates
Treaty of Jeddah (2000), between the Kingdom of Saudi Arabia and the Republic of Yemen